The Roman Catholic Archdiocese of Shenyang is a Latin Metropolitan archdiocese in northeastern PR China.

Its cathedral episcopal see is a Cathedral of the Sacred Heart of Jesus, in the city of Shenyang, capital of Liaoning Province.

History 
 Established in 1838 as Apostolic Vicariate of Liaotung 遼東 alias of Manchuria and Mongolia 滿蒙獨立, on territory split off from the then Roman Catholic Diocese of Beijing 北京
 August 20, 1840: Renamed as Apostolic Vicariate of (Liaotung and) Manchuria 遼東滿州, having lost territory to establish the Apostolic Vicariate of Mongolia 蒙古)
 May 10, 1898: Renamed as Apostolic Vicariate of Southern Manchuria 南滿, having lost territory to establish the Apostolic Vicariate of Northern Manchuria 北滿)
 December 3, 1924: Renamed as Apostolic Vicariate of Shenyang 瀋陽 alias Fengtian 奉天 alias Moukden
 Lost territory on 1929-08-02 to establish the Apostolic Prefecture of Szepingkai 四平街 and again on 1932-02-04 to establish the Apostolic Prefecture of Fushun 撫順 (now a suffragan)
 Promoted on April 11, 1946 as Metropolitan Archdiocese of Shenyang 瀋陽, ending its missionary, exempt pre-diocesan status
 Lost territory on 1949-07-14 to establish the Diocese of Yingkou 營口 (as a suffragan)

Episcopal ordinaries
(all Roman Rite)

 Apostolic Vicar of Liaotung (Manchuria and Mongolia)  遼東 
 Emmanuel-Jean-François Verrolles, Paris Foreign Missions Society (M.E.P.) (方若望) (December 11, 1838 – August 20, 1840 see below), Titular Bishop of Columbica (1838-12-11 – 1878-04-29)

 Apostolic of Vicars (Liaotung and) Manchuria 遼東滿州
 Emmanuel-Jean-François Verrolles, M.E.P. (see aboveAugust 20, 1840 – death April 29, 1878)
 Constant Dubail, M.E.P. (May 23, 1879 – death December 7, 1887), Titular Bishop of Bolina (1879-05-23 – 1887-12-07)
 Coadjutor Vicar Apostolic (never succeeded) Joseph-André Boyer, M.E.P. (1886-04-13 – death 1887-03-08), Titular Bishop of Myrina (1886-04-13 – 1887-03-08)
 Louis-Hippolyte-Aristide Raguit, M.E.P. (March 23, 1888 – death May 17, 1889), Titular Bishop of Traianopolis (in Phrygia) (1888-03-23 – 1889-05-17)
 Laurent Guillon, M.E.P. (December 28, 1889 – May 10, 1898 see below), Titular Bishop of Eumenia (1889-12-28 – 1900-07-02 see below)
 Coadjutor Vicar Apostolic (never succeeded) Pierre-Marie-François Lalouyer, M.E.P. (1897-07-24 – 1898-05-16), Titular Bishop of Raphaneæ (1897-07-24 – death 1923-02-17), later Apostolic Vicar of Northern Manchuria 北滿 (China) (1898-05-16 – 1923-02-17)

 Apostolic Vicars of Southern Manchuria 南滿
 Laurent Guillon, M.E.P. (紀隆) (see above May 10, 1898 – death July 2, 1900)
 Marie-Félix Choulet, M.E.P. (蘇裴理斯) (February 21, 1901 – July 1, 1920), Titular Bishop of Zela (February 21, 1901 – death July 31, 1923)
 Coadjutor Vicar Apostolic (never succeeded) Vincent-François-Joseph Sage (善味增爵), M.E.P. (1914-07-20 – death 1917-09-20, Titular Bishop of Cusæ (1914-07-20 – 1917-09-20)
 Jean-Marie-Michel Blois, M.E.P. (衛忠藩) (December 19, 1921 – December 3, 1924 see below), previously Apostolic Vicar of Southern Manchuria 南滿 (China) (1921-12-19 – 1924-12-03) & Titular Bishop of Lambæsis (1921-12-29 – 1946-04-11)

 Apostolic Vicar of Shenyang 瀋陽 
 Jean-Marie-Michel Blois, M.E.P. (see above December 3, 1924 – April 11, 1946 see below)

Metropolitan Archbishops of Shenyang 瀋陽 
 Jean-Marie-Michel Blois, M.E.P. (衛忠藩) (see above April 11, 1946 – death May 18, 1946)
 Ignatius Pi Shu-shi (皮漱石) (July 26, 1949 – death May 16, 1978)
uncanonical Paul Xu Zhen-jiang (1981 – death 1984-06-22) (consecrated Bishop without papal mandate 1981-07-24)
Lawrence Zhang Huai-liang (張化良) (1988 – death April 1989) (consecrated Bishop 1988-10-16)
Pius Jin Pei-xian (1989 – 2008-0-29 death 2008-11-04) (consecrated Bishop 1989-05-21)
 Paul Pei Junmin (June 29, 2008 – ...); succeeded as former Coadjutor Archbishop of Shenyang (2006-05-07 – 2008-06-29)

Province 
Its ecclesiastical province comprises the Metropolitan's own Archdiocese and the following suffragan bishoprics :
 Roman Catholic Diocese of Chifeng 赤峰
 Roman Catholic Diocese of Fushun 撫順
 Roman Catholic Diocese of Jilin 吉林
 Roman Catholic Diocese of Jehol 熱河 in Chengde
 Roman Catholic Diocese of Sipingjie 四平街
 Roman Catholic Diocese of Yanji 延吉
 Roman Catholic Diocese of Yingkou 營口

Sources and external links
 GCatholic.org, with incumbent biography links
 Catholic Hierarchy
 UCAN Diocese Profile

Roman Catholic dioceses in China
Religious organizations established in 1838
Organizations based in Liaoning
Christianity in Liaoning
Shenyang
Roman Catholic dioceses and prelatures established in the 19th century
1838 establishments in China